Bolingchessa Creek is a stream in the U.S. state of Mississippi. It is a tributary to Hanging Moss Creek.

Bolingchessa Creek is a name derived from the Choctaw language meaning "place where there are strips of hickory bark".

References

Rivers of Mississippi
Rivers of Clarke County, Mississippi
Mississippi placenames of Native American origin